Soichiro Shimizu is an artist. He was born in Tokyo, and attended Keio University and the New York City School of Visual Arts. Shimizu's work as a painter and sculptor of three-dimensional abstract works deal with the duality of seemingly opposing forces. Shimizu resides and works in Bangkok.

References

Artists from Tokyo
Japanese sculptors
Keio University alumni
School of Visual Arts alumni
Living people
Year of birth missing (living people)